Michael LoPresti Jr. was an American politician who served as a member of the Massachusetts Senate from 1973 to 1993.

LoPresti was born on April 30, 1947 in Boston. His father, Michael LoPresti Sr., was a member of the Massachusetts Senate from 1947 to 1953 and again from 1958 to 1961. LoPresti earned a bachelor's degree from Harvard College and a law degree from the Boston University School of Law.

LoPresti began his political career in 1973 by running in the special election caused by the resignation of Second Suffolk District senator Mario Umana. The then 26-year old law student upset two state representatives with the support of members of Umana's and Kevin White's organizations as well as Alfred Vellucci and Frederick C. Langone. Following redistricting, LoPresti represented the Suffolk and Middlesex District from 1975 to 1993. During his tenure in the Senate, Lopresti served as chairman of the legislature's Judiciary Committee.

LoPresti died on December 16, 2004 at his home in East Boston.

References

1947 births
2004 deaths
20th-century American politicians
Boston University School of Law alumni
Harvard University alumni
Lawyers from Boston
Democratic Party Massachusetts state senators
People from East Boston, Boston
20th-century American lawyers
American people of Italian descent